Věra Ferbasová (21 September 1913 – 4 August 1976) was a Czechoslovak film actress.

Selected filmography
 In the Little House Below Emauzy (1933)
 Man in Demand on All Sides (1934)
 A Woman Who Knows What She Wants (1934)
 The Seamstress (1936)
 The Comedian's Princess (1936)
 Three Men in the Snow (1936)
 Delightful Story (1936)
 Andula Won (1937)
 Morality Above All Else (1937)
 Vandiny trampoty (1938)
 The Doll (1938)
 Dobře situovaný pán (1939)
 Larks on a String (1969)
 Case for a Rookie Hangman (1970)
 Jáchyme, hoď ho do stroje! (1974)

References

Bibliography
 Mihola, Rudolf: Věra Ferbasová: Nejen o smutném konci nejveselejší herečky, Praha: Petrklíč, 2003

External links

1913 births
1976 deaths
People from Jičín District
People from the Kingdom of Bohemia
Czechoslovak film actresses